Events in the year 1935 in Belgium.

Incumbents
Monarch – Leopold III
Prime Minister – Georges Theunis (to 25 March); Paul van Zeeland (from 25 March)

Events

 27 April to 6 November – Brussels International Exposition (1935) held in Heysel, near Brussels.

Publications
 Emile Cammaerts, Albert of Belgium, Defender of Right (New York, Macmillan Co.)

Art and architecture

 Michel Polak's art deco Eastman Building in Brussels

Births
 21 May – Hugo Ryckeboer, dialectologist (died 2020)
 21 August – Marcel Hendrickx, politician (died 2020)
 28 September – Pierre Ryckmans, sinologist (died 2014)

Deaths
 29 August – Queen Astrid (born 1905)
 14 November – Paul Bergmans (born 1868), librarian

References

 
1930s in Belgium
Belgium
Years of the 20th century in Belgium
Belgium